Eristalina is a subtribe of hoverflies with 17 genera. Several species are well-known bee mimics, such as the drone fly (Eristalis tenax). The larvae live in aquatic and moist organic material, often with low oxygen levels using a posterior breathing tube, thus the common name—the "rat-tailed maggot".

References

Eristalinae
Insect subtribes